Diamarabougou is a village and seat of the commune of Markala in the Ségou Cercle in the Ségou Region of southern-central Mali. The village is on the right bank of the Niger River at the Markala dam which also serves as a road bridge across the river.

References

Populated places in Ségou Region